Grandis may refer to:
 Grandis (company), a company producing magnetoresistive random-access memory
 Grandis (company), a company producing High quality Italian racing bicycles
 Grandis (surname)
 Mitsubishi Grandis, a large multi-purpose vehicle
 Pizza Grandis, the most popular frozen pizza in Norway

 subspecies and hybrids
 Dactylorhiza × grandis, an orchid hybrid between D. fuchsii and D. praetermissa found in Western Europe
 Orobanche californica ssp. grandis, a subspecies of the California broomrape, a plant native to western North America from British Columbia to Idaho to Baja California
 Strix ocellata ssp. grandis, a subspecies of the mottled wood owl, a large owl species found in India

See also
 Grandi (disambiguation)
 Grande (disambiguation)